Alasgar Hajiagha oglu Alakbarov (26 March 1910, Baku – 31 January 1963, Baku), was a Soviet and Azerbaijani actor.

Career
He was born to a family of a poor merchant. He developed passion for acting and music while still a child by watching street performances and listening to dervishes' singing. In 1920 his father died and he along with his siblings was raised by his mother the tailor. Until age 15 he attended a drama club where he learned basics about acting and theatre.

Alasgar Alakbarov received his postsecondary education at a performance arts college in Baku in 1930. During the next three years he worked with the troupes at various Azeri theatres in Azerbaijan and Georgia. Starting in 1933 until his death, he worked at the Azerbaijan State Academic National Drama Theatre. He specialized mostly in tragical roles. His most famous roles were those of Vagif (Vagif by Samad Vurgun) and Othello (Othello by William Shakespeare). During his 30-year career he played Vagif around 700 times. Critics characterised his performance as extremely spirited and emotional.

Along with theatre, Alakbarov also pursued career in film. Alakbarov's first movie appearance was made in Vulkan uzarinda ev in 1929. He also starred in renowned Azerbaijani films such as Latif, Almaz, Kandlilar, Ogey ana, Uzag sahillarda, Boyuk dayaq, etc. In 1961 Alakbarov became People's Artist of the USSR after participating in a 1959 cultural event in Moscow dedicated to the Azerbaijan Soviet Socialist Republic.

Family
Alakbarov was shortly married to actress Hokuma Gurbanova. In 1934 their only daughter Naila was born.

See also
List of People's Artists of the Azerbaijan SSR

References

1910 births
1963 deaths
20th-century Azerbaijani male actors
People's Artists of the Azerbaijan SSR
People's Artists of the USSR
Recipients of the Order of Lenin
Recipients of the Order of the Red Banner of Labour
Azerbaijani male stage actors
Azerbaijani male film actors
Actors from Baku
Soviet Azerbaijani people
Soviet male actors